Alberta Provincial Highway No. 884, commonly referred to as Highway 884, is a highway in the province of Alberta, Canada. It runs south-north from Highway 1 in Suffield to Highway 13 in Amisk, between Highway 36 and Highway 41. This route is also known as 3 Street E in Youngstown. Its southern portion passes alongside and through CFB Suffield.

Major intersections 
Starting from the south end of Highway 884:

References 

884